The 1995 New England Patriots season was the team's 36th, and 26th in the National Football League (NFL). The Patriots finished the season with a record of six wins and ten losses, and finished fourth in the AFC East division. Unlike the previous year, Drew Bledsoe had a poor season by throwing just 13 touchdowns and 16 interceptions and completed just 50.8% of his passes. On the other hand, rookie running back Curtis Martin shined with a Pro Bowl season and would be the Patriots' feature back for two more seasons before being traded to the New York Jets in 1998.

The 1995 Patriots are also the team that has attempted the most passes since at least 1983.

1995 NFL Draft

Personnel

Staff

Roster

Regular season

Schedule

Game summaries

Week 13

Standings

See also 
 New England Patriots seasons

References 

New England Patriots
New England Patriots seasons
New England Patriots
Sports competitions in Foxborough, Massachusetts